Guillermo Matías Fernández (born 11 October 1991), also known as "Pol," is an Argentine professional footballer who plays as a midfielder for Argentine Primera División club Boca Juniors.

Honours
Boca Juniors
Primera División: 2019–20, 2022
Copa Argentina: 2011–12
Copa de la Liga Profesional: 2020, 2022
Supercopa Argentina: 2022

Racing Club
Primera División: 2018–19

Cruz Azul
Liga MX: Guardianes 2021
Campeón de Campeones: 2021
Supercopa MX: 2019
Leagues Cup: 2019

References

External links

1991 births
Living people
Argentine footballers
Association football midfielders
Argentine Primera División players
Liga MX players
Boca Juniors footballers
Rosario Central footballers
Atlético de Rafaela footballers
Godoy Cruz Antonio Tomba footballers
Racing Club de Avellaneda footballers
Cruz Azul footballers
Argentine expatriate footballers
Expatriate footballers in Mexico
Sportspeople from Santa Fe Province